Charlton Leland, also known as the Dr. E.B Goelet House and Saluda Inn, is a historic home located at Saluda, Polk County, North Carolina.  It was built about 1896, as a -story, Queen Anne style frame dwelling with a wraparound porch.  It was enlarged and remodeled in the Colonial Revival style when converted to an inn in 1914.  It rests on an ashlar-face stone foundation and is capped by a gable-on-hip roof with a prominent front gable.  The building houses a retreat house known as the Saluda Inn.

It was added to the National Register of Historic Places in 2006.

References

External links
Saluda Inn website

Houses on the National Register of Historic Places in North Carolina
Queen Anne architecture in North Carolina
Colonial Revival architecture in North Carolina
Houses completed in 1914
Houses in Polk County, North Carolina
National Register of Historic Places in Polk County, North Carolina